Rikke Holm Brink (born 22 March 1972) is a former Danish footballer who played as a defender and midfielder.

She played 60 matches and scored 9 goals for the Denmark national team. She competed in the 1996 Summer Olympics, playing 3 matches, the 1991 FIFA World Cup, and at the 1995 FIFA World Cup.

See also
 Denmark at the 1996 Summer Olympics

References

External links
 
 Profile at sports-reference.com

1972 births
Living people
Danish women's footballers
Place of birth missing (living people)
Footballers at the 1996 Summer Olympics
Olympic footballers of Denmark
Women's association football defenders
1995 FIFA Women's World Cup players
1991 FIFA Women's World Cup players
Denmark women's international footballers